Frederick Ferdinand Low (June 30, 1828July 21, 1894) was an American politician and diplomat who served as the 9th Governor of California and a member of the United States House of Representatives.

Early life and education
Born in Frankfort (now Winterport, Maine) in 1828, Low attended the Hampden Academy in Hampden, Maine.

Career 
Low moved to California, entering the shipping business in San Francisco in 1849. Low became a banker in Marysville, California from 1854 from 1861.

Low presented credentials as a Republican Member-elect to the 37th Congress but was not permitted to take his seat until a special act of Congress was passed. He served as a member of the U.S. House of Representatives from June 3, 1862 to March 3, 1863.

Low was appointed in 1863 as collector of the Port of San Francisco prior to becoming governor of California from December 10, 1863 to December 5, 1867. He was the second California governor to live in the Stanford Mansion as the official residence and office until the opening of the California State Capitol in 1869. Low was California's last Civil War governor. Hallmarks of his administration were the establishment of Yosemite National Park and University of California. Low was considered the father of the University of California, though his successor, Henry H. Haight, signed the Charter of the University.

Low served as United States Minister to China from 1869 to 1874.

Personal life 
He died in San Francisco on July 21, 1894. He is buried in the Cypress Lawn Memorial Park in Colma.

References

External links
Frederick Low biography at the California State Library

Republican Party governors of California
People from Winterport, Maine
People of California in the American Civil War
Ambassadors of the United States to China
1828 births
1894 deaths
19th-century American diplomats
Union (American Civil War) state governors
Republican Party members of the United States House of Representatives from California
Unionist Party state governors of the United States
19th-century American politicians
People from Marysville, California
Hampden Academy alumni
Burials at Cypress Lawn Memorial Park